May Wah Building, also registered as Mei Wah Building, is a composite building in Wan Chai, Hong Kong, located at the corner of Johnston Road and Wan Chai Road. Completed in 1963, the building contains 80 units.

Architectural characteristics 

 Building Height：14 stories: Ground + 13 floors
 Completion：1963
 Type：Composite building
 Use：Residential and Commercial
 Corner：Less than 90°, making it a acute corner building.
 Style：20th-century modernism/Bauhaus
 Address: 164–176 Johnston Road and 80 Wan Chai Road
 
Note: The terrace of May Wah Building looks like a big teardrop. This is due to the government believing a design of this type would protect people from rain. Also, the walkway of Johnston Road need to be widened, making the terraces of May Wah mansion showing the width of the walkway pre-widening.

Occupants 
G/F：Ki Chan Tea Co.
4/F：Daci Hospital
6/F：Fu Clansmen General Association Headquarters
7/F：[to be completed]
10/F：Ying King Guesthouse

In 2010, the building was described as "covered from top to bottom with signage of functioning and defunct businesses that include a guest house, clan associations, hair and beauty salons, two Chinese tea shops, fashion retail shops, massage parlors, Western and traditional Chinese medical clinics, tuition schools, fortune tellers and a feng-shui consultant."

See also 
Corner Houses
Bauhaus
Modernism

References 

Buildings and structures in Hong Kong
Buildings and structures completed in 1963
Wan Chai